Saltaire railway station serves the village of Saltaire near Shipley in West Yorkshire, England.

History

The original station was opened in May 1856 by the Midland Railway, which had absorbed the Leeds and Bradford Extension Railway between Shipley and Colne in 1851. It closed on 20 March 1965 following the Beeching Axe, but West Yorkshire Passenger Transport Executive and British Rail reopened it on 9 April 1984, at a cost of £139,000. The current station has wooden platforms and waiting shelters (though these are stone-built rather than the metal and plexiglass designs used elsewhere).  Its predecessor was of more substantial stone construction, with buildings on each platform; these were demolished in 1970, five years after the station closed.

It is a busy commuter station both for passengers travelling to Leeds and Bradford and for staff in companies based in Salt's Mill, as well as serving tourists visiting the UNESCO World Heritage Site at Saltaire.

The lower station of the Shipley Glen Tramway is about half a mile from Saltaire Station.  The Leeds and Liverpool Canal, River Aire and Roberts Park, Saltaire are also close by.

Stationmasters
Sometime after 1927 the position of station master was merged with that of Shipley.
J. Mitchell until 1861
William Secker 1861 - 1907 
Thomas Ripley 1907 - 1920 
Albert John Bell 1921 - 1927 
F.J. Dando from 1927 (formerly station master at Embsay, afterwards station master at Cherry Tree)

Facilities
Though unstaffed, the station has ticket machines available.  There is step-free access to both platforms via ramps from the street above.  Train running information can be obtained via digital information screens, timetable posters and an automated public address system.

Services
Since the May 2022 timetable update, there is a half-hourly service to Leeds, an hourly service to Bradford Forster Square and three trains per hour to Skipton (with a few peak extras) throughout the day Mondays to Saturdays.

On Sundays, there is an hourly service to Leeds and to Bradford Forster Square, with two trains per hour to Skipton. The first departures from Leeds to both Lancaster and Carlisle also call here.

References

Bibliography

Further reading

External links

Proposals to improve the station

Railway stations in Bradford
DfT Category F1 stations
Former Midland Railway stations
Railway stations in Great Britain opened in 1856
Railway stations in Great Britain closed in 1965
Railway stations in Great Britain opened in 1984
Reopened railway stations in Great Britain
Beeching closures in England
Northern franchise railway stations
Shipley, West Yorkshire
1856 establishments in England